Eric Wisely (born July 25, 1984) is an American professional mixed martial artist who formerly competed in the Lightweight division of the UFC. A professional competitor since 2006, Wisely has also fought for the Bellator and Strikeforce.

Mixed martial arts career

Early career
Wisely compiled an amateur record of 6-1 before making his professional mixed martial arts debut on December 21, 2006, against Chriss Woodruff at Midwest King of the Cage 40. Wisely won his debut in the first round. Following this win, Wisely compiled a record of 18–5 before signing with Strikeforce in mid-2011.

Strikeforce
In mid-2011, Wisely signed with now-defunct promotion Strikeforce. He made his debut against Pat Healy at Strikeforce Challengers: Gurgel vs. Duarte on August 12, 2011. He lost the fight via unanimous decision.

Ultimate Fighting Championship
Wisely made his UFC debut against Charles Oliveira in a Featherweight bout on January 28, 2012, at UFC on Fox: Evans vs. Davis. He lost the bout via submission in the first round.

Wisely replacing an injured Akira Corassani and faced Jason Young on April 14, 2012, at UFC on Fuel TV 2. He lost the fight via unanimous decision and was subsequently released from the promotion.

Bellator MMA
Wisely faced John Alessio on the Bellator 119 card on May 9, 2014, in Ontario, Canada. Wisely lost the fight via unanimous decision.

Return to UFC
Wisely was expected to face Gilbert Burns on April 27, 2019 at UFC on ESPN 3. However, it was reported on April 18, 2019 that Wisely pulled out of the bout due to a failed physical caused by heart problems. He was replaced by newcomer Mike Davis.

Mixed martial arts record

|-
|Win
|align=center| 34–9–1
|Frank Schuman
|TKO
|Caged Aggression 27: Return of the Champions Day 1
|
|align=center|2
|align=center|1:19
|Davenport, Iowa, United States
|Return to Welterweight.
|-
|Win
|align=center| 33–9–1
|Will Shutt
|TKO (punches)
|Caged Aggression 24: Champions Night 2
|
|align=center|2
|align=center|4:12
|Davenport, Iowa, United States
|Defended Caged Aggression Lightweight Championship.
|-
|Win
|align=center| 32–9–1
|Joe Richardson
|TKO (leg kicks)
|Pinnacle Combat 29
|
|align=center|3
|align=center|3:23
|Dubuque, Iowa, United States
|Won the Pinnacle Combat Lightweight Championship.
|-
| Win
| align=center| 31–9–1
| Carl Wittstock
| TKO (punches)
| Caged Aggression: Catfish Bend Casino Day 1
| 
| align=center| 3
| align=center| 1:24
| Burlington, Iowa, United States
|Defended the Caged Aggression Lightweight Championship.
|-
|Win
|align=center| 30–9–1
|Morgan Sickinger
|Submission (armbar)
|Bellator 198
|
|align=center|1
|align=center|1:12
|Rosemont, Illinois, United States
|Catchweight (150 lbs) bout.
|-
|Win
|align=center| 29–9–1
|Eric Thomas
|TKO (punches)
|Caged Aggression 21: Thai Champions Day 2
|
|align=center|3
|align=center|4:40
|Davenport, Iowa, United States
|Defended Caged Aggression Lightweight Championship.
|-
|Win
|align=center| 28–9–1
|Austin Hubbard
|Decision (unanimous)
|Caged Aggression 20: The Evolution
|
|align=center|3
|align=center|5:00
|Davenport, Iowa, United States
|Won Caged Aggression Lightweight Championship.
|-
| Win
| align=center| 27–9–1
| John Ramirez
| Submission (reverse triangle choke)
| PC MMA: Pinnacle Combat 25
| 
| align=center| 5
| align=center| 3:29
| Dubuque, Iowa, United States
|Return to Lightweight; defended Pinnacle Combat Lightweight Championship.
|-
| Win
| align=center| 26–9–1
| Sean Huffman
| Decision (unanimous)
| Battle at the Ball Park
| 
| align=center| 3
| align=center| 5:00
| Clinton, Iowa, United States
|Welterweight debut.
|-
| Win
| align=center| 25–9–1
| Demian Papagni
| TKO (punches)
| Extreme Challenge 233
| 
| align=center| 1
| align=center| 2:10
| Clinton, Iowa, United States
|Catchweight (160 lbs) bout.
|-
| Draw
| align=center| 24–9–1
| Dustin Parrish
| Draw (split)
| PC MMA: Pinnacle Combat 22
| 
| align=center| 3
| align=center| 5:00
| Dubuque, Iowa, United States
| 
|-
| Win
| align=center| 24–9
| Cliff Wright
| Decision (unanimous)
| PC MMA: Pinnacle Combat 21
| 
| align=center| 5
| align=center| 5:00
| Dubuque, Iowa, United States
|Defended Pinnacle Combat Lightweight Championship.
|-
| Win
| align=center| 23–9
| Jared Downing
| Decision (split)
| PC MMA: Pinnacle Combat 19
| 
| align=center| 3
| align=center| 5:00
| Cedar Rapids, Iowa, United States
| 
|-
| Loss
| align=center| 22–9
| John Alessio
| Decision (unanimous)
| Bellator CXIX
| 
| align=center| 3
| align=center| 5:00
| Rama, Ontario, Canada
|Catchweight (160 lbs) bout.
|-
| Win
| align=center| 22–8
| Donnie Bell
| Decision (split)
| Bellator CXIII
| 
| align=center| 3
| align=center| 5:00
| Mulvane, Kansas, United States
| 
|-
| Win
| align=center| 21–8
| Jeremy Castro
| KO (punch)
| Pinnacle Combat MMA 13
| 
| align=center| 1
| align=center| 0:29
| Dubuque, Iowa, United States
| Defended Pinnacle Combat Lightweight Championship.
|-
| Win
| align=center| 20–8
| Brian Geraghty
| Decision (unanimous)
| Pinnacle Combat MMA 11
| 
| align=center| 5
| align=center| 5:00
| Dubuque, Iowa, United States
| Won Pinnacle Combat Lightweight Championship.
|-
| Loss
| align=center| 19–8
| Jason Young
| Decision (unanimous)
| UFC on Fuel TV: Gustafsson vs. Silva
| 
| align=center| 3
| align=center| 5:00
| Stockholm, Sweden
| 
|-
| Loss
| align=center| 19–7
| Charles Oliveira
| Submission (reverse calf slicer)
| UFC on Fox: Evans vs. Davis
| 
| align=center| 1
| align=center| 1:43
| Chicago, Illinois, United States
| Featherweight debut.
|-
| Win
| align=center| 19–6
| Brandon Girtz
| TKO (arm injury)
| Driller Promotions / SEG: Downtown Showdown 1
| 
| align=center| 2
| align=center| 4:26
| Minneapolis, Minnesota, United States
| 
|-
| Loss
| align=center| 18–6
| Pat Healy
| Decision (unanimous)
| Strikeforce Challengers: Gurgel vs. Duarte
| 
| align=center| 3
| align=center| 5:00
| Las Vegas, Nevada, United States
| 
|-
| Win
| align=center| 18–5
| Lance Wipf
| Decision (split)
| Superior Cage Combat 1
| 
| align=center| 3
| align=center| 5:00
| Las Vegas, Nevada, United States
| 
|-
| Win
| align=center| 17–5
| Matt Veach
| Submission (armbar)
| Gladiator Cage Fights: Knockout Night 1
| 
| align=center| 2
| align=center| 2:49
| Marion, Illinois, United States
| 
|-
| Win
| align=center| 16–5
| Hermes França
| Decision (unanimous)
| Scorpius Fighting Championships 1
| 
| align=center| 3
| align=center| 5:00
| Fort Lauderdale, Florida, United States
| 
|-
| Win
| align=center| 15–5
| Lonnie Scriven
| Decision (unanimous)
| Glory Fighting Championships: Maximum Glory
| 
| align=center| 5
| align=center| 5:00
| Des Moines, Iowa, United States
| 
|-
| Loss
| align=center| 14–5
| Ramiro Hernandez
| Decision (split)
| Blueblood MMA: Trials of a Gladiator 6
| 
| align=center| 3
| align=center| 5:00
| Davenport, Iowa, United States
| 
|-
| Win
| align=center| 14–4
| Hermes França
| TKO (punches)
| Max Fights DM: Ballroom Brawl 4
| 
| align=center| 1
| align=center| 2:03
| West Des Moines, Iowa, United States
| 
|-
| Win
| align=center| 13–4
| Scott McAfee
| Decision (split)
| Pinnacle Combat MMA 3
| 
| align=center| 3
| align=center| 5:00
| Dubuque, Iowa, United States
| 
|-
| Loss
| align=center| 12–4
| Jeremy Ashley
| Decision (unanimous)
| Legends of Fighting 32: Strictly Business
| 
| align=center| 3
| align=center| 5:00
| Indianapolis, Indiana, United States
| 
|-
| Win
| align=center| 12–3
| Cole Williams
| Submission (armbar)
| Pinnacle Combat MMA 2
| 
| align=center| 2
| align=center| 2:34
| Dubuque, Iowa, United States
| 
|-
| Loss
| align=center| 11–3
| Ramiro Hernandez
| Decision (unanimous)
| WhiteApe MMA: Gorilla Warfare
| 
| align=center| 3
| align=center| 5:00
| Davenport, Iowa, United States
| 
|-
| Win
| align=center| 11–2
| Tristian Hansburger
| TKO (punches)
| Extreme Cage Challenge
| 
| align=center| 1
| align=center| 3:30
| Clinton, Iowa, United States
| 
|-
| Win
| align=center| 10–2
| Danny Rodriguez
| Submission
| Spring Breakage
| 
| align=center| 1
| align=center| N/A
| Moline, Illinois, United States
| 
|-
| Win
| align=center| 9–2
| Lucas Gwaltney
| TKO (doctor stoppage)
| Mainstream MMA 9: New Era
| 
| align=center| 3
| align=center| N/A
| Cedar Rapids, Iowa, United States
| 
|-
| Win
| align=center| 8–2
| Micah Washington
| TKO (punches)
| Mainstream MMA 8: Cold War
| 
| align=center| 2
| align=center| N/A
| Cedar Rapids, Iowa, United States
| 
|-
| Loss
| align=center| 7–2
| Erik Koch
| Decision (unanimous)
| Mainstream MMA 7: Vengeance
| 
| align=center| 3
| align=center| 5:00
| Cedar Rapids, Iowa, United States
| 
|-
| Win
| align=center| 7–1
| Jason Medina
| TKO (punches)
| Iron Horse: Bike and Music Festival 2007
| 
| align=center| 2
| align=center| N/A
| Sabula, Iowa, United States
| 
|-
| Loss
| align=center| 6–1
| Jeremy Castro
| Decision (majority)
| Iron Horse: Bike and Music Festival 2007
| 
| align=center| 3
| align=center| 5:00
| Sabula, Iowa, United States
| 
|-
| Win
| align=center| 6–0
| Willie Dale
| KO (punches)
| Ring Style: Bad Blood 2
| 
| align=center| 2
| align=center| N/A
| Moline, Illinois United States
| 
|-
| Win
| align=center| 5–0
| Brady Wakeland
| N/A
| Midwest King of the Ring 44
| 
| align=center| 2
| align=center| 1:23
| 
| 
|-
| Win
| align=center| 4–0
| Alex Wakeland
| N/A
| Midwest King of the Ring 42
| 
| align=center| 3
| align=center| 2:21
| 
| 
|-
| Win
| align=center| 3–0
| Cody Clayes
| N/A
| Midwest King of the Ring 41
| 
| align=center| 1
| align=center| 1:16
| 
| 
|-
| Win
| align=center| 2–0
| Nathan Aber
| N/A
| Midwest King of the Ring 40
| 
| align=center| 1
| align=center| 2:23
| 
| 
|-
| Win
| align=center| 1–0
| Chriss Woodruff
| N/A
| Midwest King of the Ring 40
| 
| align=center| 1
| align=center| 0:41
| 
|

References

External links

1984 births
Living people
Mixed martial artists from Iowa
American male mixed martial artists
People from East Moline, Illinois
People from Clinton, Iowa
Featherweight mixed martial artists
Welterweight mixed martial artists
Lightweight mixed martial artists
Mixed martial artists utilizing taekwondo
American male taekwondo practitioners